Pedois humerana is a species of moth of the family Depressariidae. It is found in Australia, where it has been recorded from New South Wales and Tasmania.

The forewings are yellow with a jagged black bar across the middle and at the base. The hindwings are plain grey.

References

Pedois
Moths of Australia
Moths described in 1863